Lycosa indagatrix is a species of spiders of the genus Lycosa native to India and Sri Lanka. The habitats include tunnels and burrows and it is a purely nocturnal spider.

See also 
 List of Lycosidae species

References

Spiders described in 1837
Lycosidae
Spiders of Asia